Elizaveta Klyuchereva (Елизавета Ключерева, born 1999) is a Russian pianist who began studying music at the age of six. In 2006, she became a student at the music school of the Moscow Conservatory. She is a winner of more than 20 competitions.

Biography
Born on 27 May 1999, in Moscow, Russia,  Elizaveta Klyuchereva has studied music since she was six, first with Manana Kandelaky and later with Alexander Strukov and Kira Shashkina at the Central Music School of Moscow's State Conservatory where, as of January 2016, she is in the tenth grade . She has performed in Russia, Germany, China, CZ Republic, England, America, Ukraine, Denmark,  France, and Italy and has been awarded five Grand Prizes. Orchestras she has performed with include the Moscow Chamber Orchestra, and the Kharkiv Symphony Orchestra. She has received support from the Yamaha Music Foundation and the Vladimir Spivakov International Charity Foundation.

Awards
Since 2010, Klyuchereva has received many awards, including:

2010: Scriabin International Piano Competition, Paris, France, 1st prize
2012: XI International Vladimir Krainev Young Pianists Competition, Kharkiv, Ukraine, 3rd prize
2012: VII Villuan International Young Pianists Competition, Nizhniy Novgorod, Russia, 1st Prize and Grand Prix
2012: VI A. Artobolevskaya International Competition for Young Pianists, Moscow, Grand Prix
2012: Music Without Limits, Lithuania, Grand Prix
2013: Aarhus International Piano Competition, Aarhus, Denmark, 3rd prize
2013: VI Young Pianists Competition of the North, Newcastle, England, 1st Prize 
2013: IX International Piano Festival Competition for Children and Youth, Villahermosa, Mexico, 1st Prize
2014: Virtuosi per musica di pianoforte, Ústí nad Labem, Czech Republic, Grand Prix
2015: Aarhus International Piano Competition, Aarhus, Denmark, 3rd prize
2015: IX International Tchaikovsky Competition for Young Musicians, Novosibirsk, Russia, 2nd prize
2016 - Elizaveta has received First Prize at the Concertino Praga Competition.

2016 - Elizaveta has received II Prize and Silver Medal at Arthur Rubinstein Youth Piano Competition, Beijing, China.

References

1999 births
Living people
Russian pianists
Russian women pianists
Russian women musicians
21st-century pianists
Child classical musicians
Women classical pianists
21st-century women pianists